Nadezhdinsky (masculine), Nadezhdinskaya (feminine), or Nadezhdinskoye (neuter) may refer to:
Nadezhdinsky District, a district of Primorsky Krai, Russia
Nadezhdinsky (rural locality) (Nadezhdinskaya, Nadezhdinskoye), name of several rural localities in Russia